The Di Rudinì I government of Italy held office from 6 February 1891 until 15 May 1892, a total of 464 days, or 1 year, 3 months and 9 days.

Government parties
The government was composed by the following parties:

Composition

References

Italian governments
1891 establishments in Italy